Clarksburg is a census-designated place and an unincorporated area in northern Montgomery County, Maryland, United States. It is located at the northern end of the Interstate 270 technology corridor, approximately four miles north of Germantown. As of the 2020 census, Clarksburg had a population of 29,051.

Geography 
As an unincorporated area, Clarksburg's boundaries are not officially defined. Clarksburg is, however, recognized by the United States Census Bureau as a census-designated place, and by the United States Geological Survey as a populated place.

Roads in Clarksburg include MD 355, I-270, and MD 121.

Demographics 

As of the 2010 census, there were 13,766 people and 4,352 households residing in the area. The population is roughly 44.1% White, 14.7% African-American, 0.1% American Indian or Alaska Native, 33.6% Asian, 0.1% Native Hawaiian or Pacific Islander, including 9.8% of the population Hispanic or Latino origin of any race.

In 2000 there were 604 households, out of which 42.1% had children under the age of 18 living with them, 72.0% were married couples living together, 6.6% had a female householder with no husband present, and 17.5% were non-families. 13.9% of all households were made up of individuals, and 4.6% had someone living alone who was 65 years of age or older. The average household size was 3.04 and the average family size was 3.34.

In the area, the population was spread out, with 29.3% under the age of 18, 4.8% from 18 to 24, 29.7% from 25 to 44, 27.4% from 45 to 64, and 8.8% who were 65 years of age or older. The median age was 38 years. For every 100 females, there were 100.2 males. For every 100 females age 18 and over, there were 103.6 males.

The median income for a household in the CDP was $88,419, and the median income for a family was $91,216. Males had a median income of $63,125 versus $42,283 for females. The per capita income for the area was $33,174. About 3.4% of families and 4.6% of the population were below the poverty line, including 6.3% of those under age 18 and 6.8% of those age 65 or over.

Race Demographics

History
Clarksburg is named for trader John Clarke, and was established at the intersection of the main road between Georgetown and Frederick and an old Seneca trail. The inn itself is a footnote in history, hosting the army of General Edward Braddock during the French and Indian War, serving as a meeting place for local Sons of Liberty in the years before the American Revolution, and possibly serving dinner to President Andrew Jackson on his way to his inauguration. Jamie, grandson of the trader, built a general store in the area around 1770, and over the next thirty years enough people moved to the area that Clark was appointed postmaster for the community. By 1875, Clarksburg was a major town in the northern part of the county, but the construction of the Baltimore and Ohio Railroad undermined its economy.

In 1964, the Montgomery County planning commission decided that Clarksburg would be the last community along Interstate 270 that would have large-scale development. The Montgomery County Council adopted a master plan for Clarksburg in 1968, which rezoned land for a mix of townhouses and single-family houses. Another master plan was adopted in 1994. This master plan set forth the areas to be developed, with targets for housing, retail, employment and transit. A network of roads and infrastructure was mapped out to handle the growth expected as the town grew to 40,000 residents. The center of this plan is the Town Center District, which contains a retail area connected to the historic town business district. It was planned to be built early on, but had not broken ground by 2010, to the dismay of some residents. A Harris Teeter-anchored shopping center opened in 2013, and a large mall called Clarksburg Premium Outlets opened in October 2016. The shopping complex has over 90 stores and provides jobs for the region.

In June 2015, the Clarksburg Chamber of Commerce held a contest and chose a flag designed by Shaneea Peek. The inspiration of the flag was derived from Dowden's Ordinary which is a historic landmark of the community of Clarksburg.

Development 

Since 2000, there has been major growth in the area of Clarksburg. A new town center is being built in the heart of Clarksburg, near the historic center. 2010 Census data showed that over 13,677 residents and 4,352 households resided in Clarksburg, which consisted of a diverse population with a high level of education attainment. Several public parks and schools have been built to help accommodate the growth.

Zoning violations 
During the boom growth period it was discovered that some of the new houses were built closer together than the minimum distance required by zoning laws, with roads built too narrow for fire trucks to pass, and homes and community facilities built without adequate permits or approvals by the county government. This was found to be the fault of inadequate county oversight and lax enforcement of building codes and laws combined with a building boom in the early 2000s.

Environmental impacts 
In April 2014, the Montgomery County Council set additional limits on development projects in order to protect the quality of nearby Tenmile Creek, a drinking water source and emergency water supply for the metropolitan Washington, D.C. area.  Later that year, developers filed suit against the county, claiming that the county "illegally limited construction on its property." The U.S. District Court in Maryland dismissed the suit in August 2017. The district court's dismissal was affirmed by the Fourth Circuit Court of Appeals on November 29, 2018.

Parks and recreation 
Clarksburg has many local hiking trails, small playgrounds, and sport fields. There are local campgrounds and community pools. Parks in the area include Little Bennett Park, Black Hill Regional Park and Ridge Road Recreational Park. Multiple farms, private and public, serve production and tourism purposes.

School enrollment 

The two newest schools, Little Bennett Elementary School and Clarksburg High School, have the largest increase of students, with Little Bennett at 71.4% above building capacity in the projections of 2011-2012. This has led to a moratorium in issuance of permits for new projects, but not issuance of permits in existing projects, for new homes in the Clarksburg area. The majority of planned housing units will be built in existing projects.  All four of the largest neighborhoods are exempt from the moratorium.

Businesses and organizations
 BrightFocus Foundation
 Thales Communications
 Clarksburg Chamber of Commerce
 Clarksburg Historical Society, Inc.

References

External links

 Clarksburg - Montgomery County Planning Department

Census-designated places in Maryland
Census-designated places in Montgomery County, Maryland
Populated places established in 1752
1752 establishments in Maryland